The Hausner ratio is a number that is correlated to the flowability of a powder or granular material. It is named after the engineer Henry H. Hausner (1900–1995).

The Hausner ratio is calculated by the formula

The Hausner ratio is not an absolute property of a material; its value can vary depending on the methodology used to determine it. 

The Hausner ratio is used in a wide variety of industries  as an indication of the flowability of a powder.  A Hausner ratio greater than 1.25 - 1.4 is considered to be an indication of poor flowability.  The Hausner ratio (H) is related to the Carr index (C), another indication of flowability, by the formula . Both the Hausner ratio and the Carr index are sometimes criticized, despite their relationships to flowability being established empirically, as not having a strong theoretical basis. Use of these measures persists, however, because the equipment required to perform the analysis is relatively cheap and the technique is easy to learn.

References

General Bibliography

Particulates
Pharmaceutics